Albert Noel Ross (25 December 1922 – 18 March 2003) was an Australian rules footballer who played with Richmond in the Victorian Football League (VFL).

Family
The son of John Ross (1896–1985), and Lillian Florence Ross (1898–1975), née Bridgman, Albert Noel Ross was born at Auburn, Victoria on 25 December 1922.

Military service
Prior to his VFL football career, Ross served in the Australian Army during World War II.

Football

Foster
He played with the Foster Football Club in the Alberton League over many years: 1937-1944, 1948 (when he won the competition's best and fairest), 1954, 1957, 1959, 1960 (captain-coach in 1954 and 1959), playing his last match at the age of 37.

Richmond (VFL)
Recruited from Foster in 1945. He played with Richmond over four seasons, 1945, 1946, 1947, and 1949  he returned to Foster for the 1948 season  playing in 35 First XVII games and 21 Second XVIII games (including the 1947 Second's Grand Final).

Mirboo North
He played with Mirboo North for two seasons (1950-1951); and, in 1951, won the Mid Gippsland Football League's best and fairest award.

Notes

References 
 World War Two Nominal Roll: Private Albert Noel Ross (VX78626), Department of Veterans' Affairs.
 A13860, VX78626: World War Two Service Record: Private Albert Noel Ross (VX78626), National Archives of Australia.
 B883, VX78626: World War Two Service Record: Private Albert Noel Ross (VX78626), National Archives of Australia.
 Hogan P: The Tigers Of Old, Richmond FC, (Melbourne), 1996.

External links 
 
 

1922 births
2003 deaths
Australian rules footballers from Victoria (Australia)
Richmond Football Club players